Rajaraman may refer to:

 S. Rajaraman
 V Rajaraman